Adoxophyes meion is a species of moth of the family Tortricidae first described by Józef Razowski in 2013. It is found on Seram Island in Indonesia. The habitat consists of secondary forests and dipterocarp forests.

The wingspan is about 14 mm. The forewings are glossy white yellow with cream-ferruginous markings with rust edges. The hindwings are white cream.

Etymology
The species name refers to the size of the species and is derived from Greek meion (meaning smaller).

References

Moths described in 2013
Adoxophyes
Moths of Indonesia